The Tikbalang (/ˈtikbaˌlaŋ/) (also Tigbalang, Tigbalan, Tikbalan, Tigbolan, or Werehorse) is a creature of Philippine folklore said to lurk in the mountains and rainforests of the Philippines. It is a tall, bony humanoid creature with the head and hooves of a horse and disproportionately long limbs, to the point that its knees reach above its head when it squats down. In some versions, it is a transformation of an aborted fetus sent to earth from limbo.

Historical Accounts
"There were also ghosts, which they called vibit; and phantoms, which they called Tigbalaang." 

Fr. Juan de Plasencia, Customs of the Tagalogs (1589)

"450. They greatly fear and reverence the tigbàlang or bibit. This is a ghost, goblin, or devil; and as it knows the cowardice of these Indians, it has been wont to appear to them in the mountains—now in the guise of an old man, telling them that he is their nono; now as a horse; and now as a monster. Consequently, the Indians in their terror make various pacts with it, and trade their rosaries for various articles of superstitious value, such as hairs, grass, stones, and other things, in order to obtain all their intents and free themselves from all the dangers. Thus do they live in delusion until God wills that the evangelical ministers undeceive them, which costs no little [effort], because of the very great fear with which they are filled."

Fr. Francisco de San Antonio, Cronicas (1738–44)

"The tigbalang is another object of which they stand in great awe. It is described as a phantom, which assumes a variety of uncouth and monstrous shapes, and interposes its authority, to prevent their performing the duties, prescribed by our religion."

Fr. Martinez de Zuniga, Estadismo (1803)

Origins

The form of the Tikbalang traces back 4000 years ago, with roots in Hinduism which explain how that influence evolved into the mysterious half-horse creature we know today.

Ancient people in the Philippines believed in animism. They believed that the world had its  consciousness and that stones, trees, mountains, water, animals, sun,  and the moon had a hidden power known as the spirit or the 'idol'. This power could be good or harm the spirit, but it was believed to control some aspects of life. 
in 1589, during the earliest days of the Spanish occupation, Father Juan de Plasencia documented the long-term Tikbalang awareness of indigenous peoples.

Hinduism, from its origins in India, spread to Southeast Asia in 200 CE as Indian cultural influence spread throughout the region through trade routes. Tikbalang may have originated from Hayagriva, an avatar of the Hindu god Vishnu. The worship of Hayagriva was recorded in 2000 BCE.

The images for giant flying birds, the Tikbalang, and Sirena are straight out of Hindu imagery. Influence on religion was also prevalent with the concept of a multi-layered world – Heaven and Hell.  According to the Hindu Puranas, there are fourteen worlds in the universe: the seven upper and the seven lower. The seven upper worlds are Bhuh, Bhavah, Swah, Mahah, Janah. Tapah, and Satyam; and the seven nether worlds are Atala, Vitala, Sutala, Rasatala, Talatala, Mahatala, and Patala. The region known as Bhuh is the earth where we dwell.

Association with Tikbalang began around the 1860 discovery of a statue in Cambodia during the 10th century. It portrayed the demons that Vadavamuka, the more radical version of the avatar of Vishnu. Eventually, Buddhism changed the image of Hayagriva into a small horse's head floating in a crown of fire. In China, provided the old image of Hayagriva face with horses – one of the  keepers of the demon of an inferno. The same thing probably happened to the Tikbalang as the Filipinos adopted it in their beliefs after exacting culture through trade. Nine hundred years before the Spaniards arrived, Chinese merchants settled in the Philippines and used horses. The evolution of the Tikbalang probably started then.

The idea of tikbalang evolved over time telling the journey of the Filipino consciousness through colonialism and globalism. As there were no horses in the Philippines before the arrival of the Spanish, the earliest mentions of these mythological creatures did not specify horse or animal morphology (i.e. Plasencia's 16th c. account). Instead in the pre-colonial period, they were represented as ghosts and spirits of the forests, associated with the terms 'multo' and 'bibit' (some entries described them in early Spanish dictionaries as 'fantasma de montes' i.e. 'phantoms of the mountains/wilds', linking them strongly as nature spirits). In historical dictionaries (San Buenaventura's 1613 Vocabulario spelled as "tigbalang"), they were likened to the tiyanac, while in some entries they were given the definition as "satyrs" (satiro), "gnomes" (duendes) or "goblins" (trasgo). Individual tikbalangs, even today among superstitious Filipinos, are thought to inhabit trees as guardians (sometimes depicted as if the very soul of these trees). Specific trees (and nature in general) in pre-colonial Philippines were considered sacred (often used as shrines), esp. the large ficus trees (known locally as balete). An offensive expression "Tigbalang ca mandin!" "You are a wild beast!" was used by early Tagalogs to signify one as uncouth and uncivilized. Later on, as horses were brought from China and Japan through the Spanish colonial government, accounts of them appearing horse-like slowly became the norm (i.e. de San Antonio's 18th c. account). 

This mirrors a similar cultural evolution of another mythological creature from the Philippines, the kapre. The kapre evolved from earlier mentions of forest dwelling-giants who kidnap children during the early colonial period (mirroring how they were viewed in pre-colonial times), to eventually becoming depicted as a tall dark men (cafre slaves brought by Iberians from East Africa via India) who smoked tobacco (a New World plant imported to Asia via Columbian Exchange) during the colonial and modern era.

Superstitions
Tikbalangs or Tigbolan scare travelers, lead them astray and play tricks on them such as making them return to an arbitrary path no matter how far they go or turn. This is counteracted by wearing one's shirt inside out. Another countermeasure is to ask permission out loud to pass by or, not to produce too much noise while in the woods in order not to offend or disturb the tikbalang. The "tigbolan" is a ghost which assumes a variety of forms, and sometimes confers a similar gift upon a certain favored individual. A superstition popular with the Tagalogs of Rizal Province is that Tikbalangs are benevolent guardians of elemental kingdoms. They are usually found standing at the foot of large trees looking around for anyone who dares to bestow malignancy on their kingdom's territory.

A common saying has it that rain from a clear sky means "may kinakasal na tikbalang."(Filipino, "a tikbalang is getting married".) This was potentially connected with a similar Spanish proverb that claimed a witch was getting married when there was rain on a sunny day,  although many cultures have such sayings in which a trickster figure gets married (cp. fox's wedding, bear's wedding, monkey's birthday/wedding).

In some versions, the tikbalang can also transform itself into human form or turn invisible to humans. They like to lead travelers astray.

Tikbalang is generally associated with dark, sparsely populated, foliage-overgrown areas, with legends variously identifying their abode as being beneath bridges, in bamboo clumps or banana groves, and atop Kalumpang (Sterculia foetida) or Balite (Ficus indica) trees.

Account of Iluminado Cataytay (1959) from Barangay Sumilang, Quezon province, Philippines provides accurate information, as he witnessed from age of 4 up to his death in 1969.

Taming a tikbalang
By one account a tikbalang has a mane of sharp spines, with the three thickest of these being of particular importance. A person who obtains one of these spines can use them as an anting-anting (talisman)  to keep the tikbalang as his servant. The tikbalang must first be subdued, however, by leaping onto it and tying it with a specially-prepared cord. The would-be-tamer must then hang on while the creature flies through the air, fighting madly to dislodge its unwelcome rider until it is exhausted and acknowledges its defeat. Or you can look on his mane and you will see 3 golden hairs and if you pluck 3 of them before he/she eats you, they will serve you until you die.

In popular culture
 Tikbalang: The Horse Demon was the first episode of the 2015 Creatures Of Philippine Mythology documentary web series produced by The Aswang Project and High Banks Entertainment Ltd.  It traces back the origin of the Tikbalang's image to India, circa 2000BCE, and follows its evolution to the modern-day.
 A tikbalang named Lusyo features prominently in The Mythology Class, a graphic novel written and illustrated by Filipino comic creator Arnold Arre.
 Tikbalang Kung Kabilugan ng Buwan is a child-friendly telling of the Tikbalang mythos – written by Victoria Añonuevo, illustrated by Kora Dandan-Albano and released by Adarna House – intended to familiarize young Filipino audiences with Philippine Mythological creatures. In the story, a Tikbalang becomes lonely for lack of a playmate during the full moon, a time when Filipino children of generations past traditionally went out to play in the moonlight. In a search for a playmate, the Tikbalang leaves his home in the Kalumpang tree and encounters first a Kapre, then a Nuno, an Aswang, and a Tiyanak before he finally meets another Tikbalang as a suitable playmate.
 A Tikbalang features as a fae in series 3, episode 10 ("Delinquents") of the SyFy supernatural drama Lost Girl.
 A Tikbalang was featured as the deity itself, another as a racecar driver, and more as the fighters in the fighting scene in the Netflix's Singaporean anime-influenced streaming television series based on the Filipino comic series, Trese, that was released the day before the Philippines' Independence Day.
 Tikbalang is the name of a unit in the wargame Infinity, where many of the war machines are given mythological names.
 Tikbalang, along with other creatures are also appeared in 1978 animated film, Tadhana (Destiny).

See also
 List of fictional horses
 Sihuanaba

References

Further reading

Footnotes

External links
 Keith Thompson's rendition of a tikbalang.

Philippine legendary creatures
Horses in mythology
Mythological hybrids
Philippine mythology
Hinduism in the Philippines
Horses in Hinduism
Horses in India